The Bugler's Grandsons (Romanian: Nepoții gornistulu) is a 1953 Romanian drama film directed by Dinu Negreanu. The film was shot at the Buftea Studios in Bucharest. It was the first in a two-part production portraying ordinary Romanian life of recent decades, covering the period between the Romanian War of Independence and the 1930s. It was followed by the sequel The Sun Rises in 1954.

Cast
 Marga Barbu – Simina
  – Pintea Dorobanțu
 Liviu Ciulei 
 Constantin Codrescu – Ilieș
  – Stanca Dorobanțu
 Iurie Darie – Miron
 Ernest Maftei 
 Constantin Ramadan – Grigore Leahu
 George Vraca – Dobre Răcoviceanu

References

Bibliography 
 Liehm, Mira & Liehm, Antonín J. The Most Important Art: Eastern European Film After 1945. University of California Press, 1977.

External links 
 

1953 films
1950s war drama films
Romanian drama films
1950s Romanian-language films
Films directed by Dinu Negreanu
1953 drama films
Romanian black-and-white films
Romanian World War I films
Romanian World War II films
World War I films set on the Eastern Front
Eastern Front of World War II films